Okoyo Airport  is an airstrip serving the town of Okoyo in the Cuvette Department of the Republic of the Congo.

See also

 List of airports in the Republic of the Congo
 Transport in the Republic of the Congo

References

External links
OpenStreetMap - Okoyo
OurAirports - Okoyo

Airports in the Republic of the Congo
Cuvette Department